Yuyapichis District is one of five districts of the province Puerto Inca in Peru.

Languages
According to the 2007 census, Spanish was spoken by 90.3% of the population as their first language, while 4.5% spoke Asháninka, 4.3% spoke Quechua, 0.5% spoke Aymara. 0.1% spoke other indigenous languages and 0.0% spoke foreign languages.

References